Evan Roberts MBE,  M.Sc., (hons) (1909 – July 1991) was a Welsh botanist and conservationist.

Evan Roberts was an internationally known and recognised botanist, who lived and worked all his life in Capel Curig (Gelli), in Snowdonia, Gwynedd, North Wales.

Roberts worked as a quarryman until the age of 44, when silicosis forced him to retire. He was later employed by the Nature Conservancy Council as warden of Cwm Idwal.

References

Robin Gwyndaf: The Mountain Man A portrayal of Evan Roberts, Capel Curig, rockman, botanist and conservationist. First published in Welsh in 1987, in English translation in May 2006

1909 births
1991 deaths
Welsh mountain climbers
20th-century Welsh writers
People from Gwynedd
Welsh botanists
Capel Curig
20th-century British botanists